Brănișca is a commune in Hunedoara County, Transylvania, Romania. It is composed of nine villages: Bărăștii Iliei (Baresd), Boz (Bóz), Brănișca, Căbești (Kabesd), Furcșoara (Furksora), Gialacuta (Gyálakuta), Rovina (Bikótelep), Târnava (Tirnáva) and Târnăvița (Tirnavica).

References

Communes in Hunedoara County
Localities in Transylvania